John Cecil Beaumont Vaughan (born June 8, 1945) is a Barbadian-born Canadian cricketer. He played three One Day Internationals for Canada.

External links

1945 births
Canada One Day International cricketers
Canadian cricketers
Living people
Barbadian emigrants to Canada
Barbadian cricketers